Podgórzyn  is a village in Jelenia Góra County, Lower Silesian Voivodeship, in south-western Poland. It is the seat of the administrative district (gmina) called Gmina Podgórzyn.

The village has a population of 1,700.

References

External links
 Podgorzyn

Villages in Karkonosze County